Kesavapuram is a village in Thiruvattaru taluk, Kanyakumari district, Tamil Nadu. The village is part of the Viswnabhapuram legislative assembly constituency and the Kanyakumari parliamentary constituency. The village is located about 7 km north-east of Marthandam and 31 km north-west of Nagercoil.

The village is home to the St. Sebastian Church which is considered to be 100 years old.

References

Villages in Kanyakumari district